Volodymyr Viktorovych Krynskyi (born 14 January 1997) is a Ukrainian professional footballer who plays as a goalkeeper for 1. SK Prostějov.

Career
Krynskyi is a product of UFK-Olimpik Kharkiv youth sportive system. In 2014, he signed contract with FC Poltava in the Ukrainian First League and made his debjut in match against FC Kolos Kovalivka on 8 October 2016.

On 2 July 2018, he signed 3-year contract with Ukrainian Premier League club Olimpik Donetsk after the dissolution of FC Poltava.

References

External links
 
 

1997 births
Living people
Kharkiv State College of Physical Culture 1 alumni
Ukrainian footballers
Ukrainian expatriate footballers
Association football goalkeepers
FC Poltava players
FC Olimpik Donetsk players
FC Inhulets Petrove players
FC Volyn Lutsk players
FC Podillya Khmelnytskyi players
1. SK Prostějov players
Ukrainian Premier League players
Ukrainian First League players
Sportspeople from Kharkiv Oblast
Expatriate footballers in the Czech Republic
Ukrainian expatriate sportspeople in the Czech Republic